Sarah Bombell (born 12 April 1983) is an Australian competitor in synchronized swimming and a Commonwealth Games bronze medallist.

Sarah started competing in synchronised swimming at age 10 and represented her national team for the first time in 2004.  Sarah also represented Australia at the 2008 Beijing Olympics where she reached 7th place, as well as participating in several World Championships. At the Commonwealth Games in 2010, she won the bronze medal in the women's duet event with Eloise Amberger. She teamed with Amberger at the 2012 Summer Olympics, and was also part of the Australian team, which finished in 8th.

References 

1983 births
Living people
Australian synchronised swimmers
Commonwealth Games bronze medallists for Australia
Synchronised swimmers at the 2010 Commonwealth Games
Olympic synchronised swimmers of Australia
Synchronized swimmers at the 2008 Summer Olympics
Synchronized swimmers at the 2012 Summer Olympics
Commonwealth Games medallists in synchronised swimming
Swimmers from Sydney
Sportswomen from New South Wales
Medallists at the 2010 Commonwealth Games